Gerstheim is a commune in the Bas-Rhin department in Alsace in north-eastern France.

Geography

Economy
During the early twentieth century many jobs were provided by the tobacco and sugar industries.   There are currently still a few employment opportunities involving agriculture and tourism in the village.    There is also an EDF hydro-electric installation incorporating a lock and a road crossing on the Rhine.  Some residents work in Strasbourg and many commute across the border to work in Germany.

One of Europe's largest theme parks positioned just across the border provides a large number of mainly seasonal low-paid jobs.

Places to see
 A Jewish cemetery on the edge of the town (abandoned since 1940).
 Twelfth-century castle 'Manoir de Bancalis'.
 Artificial island 'L'île de Gerstheim ' created 1960 as part of the EDF hydro-electric project.  Small nature reserve subject to periodic flooding.

Organ
The Protestant church contains an organ built by the Wetzel brothers around 1870.   In 1917 German troops requisitioned part of the instrument, but it was restored in 1926 by the Strasbourg organ builder Edmond Alexandre Roethinger.   A further restoration took place in 1972.

See also
 Communes of the Bas-Rhin department

References

Communes of Bas-Rhin
Bas-Rhin communes articles needing translation from French Wikipedia